The Jetsons Meet the Flintstones is a 1987 animated crossover made-for-television film produced by Hanna-Barbera for syndication as part of the Hanna-Barbera Superstars 10 series. The two-hour special stars the cast of the Hanna-Barbera sitcoms The Flintstones and The Jetsons as they cross paths following a time travel experiment gone wrong.

Plot
In the future, while Elroy is busy working on a time machine, George Jetson comes to Mr. Spacely's office for a serious discussion. Spacely's rival, Cogswell, has been stealing Spacely's business ideas, putting their jobs in jeopardy. Spacely wrongfully blames George, suspecting that he was spying for Cogswell. Spacely orders George to spy on Cogswell to clear his name to avoid getting fired. George finds out that Cogswell's robot computer, S.A.R.A., has been seducing the Spacely robot computer, R.U.D.I., into leaking Mr. Spacely's secrets. George tries to report this to Spacely, but R.U.D.I. sabotages his efforts.

In the Stone Age, Wilma and Betty are trying to convince Fred Flintstone to have their vacation in Honolurock (Honolulu), but Fred ignores their efforts. Later, at work, Fred tells Barney Rubble that he plans to vacation somewhere even better, and that he wishes to attend a poker tournament being held at the Water Buffalo lodge (where they are members with meetings) later that day. However, Mr. Slate shows up and informs the duo that they must work the late shift because they're going on vacation, and Turk Tarpit, Slate's business rival, and nemesis, has been outproducing them. Fred and Barney disobey Slate's orders and go to the poker tournament. However, after seeing that Slate is playing there too, they disguise themselves. Fred plays against Slate but loses. A spider exposes Barney, and ultimately Fred. Furious that they deceived and disobeyed him, Slate fires Fred and Barney.

Back in the future, Elroy completes his time machine. The Jetsons decide to use it to take a trip to the 25th century to relax. Right before Elroy gets the machine working, his dog, Astro, accidentally sets the switch to "Past."

With no job, the Flintstones and Rubbles are forced to settle for a camping holiday. As Fred and Barney set up the tent, the Jetsons arrive from the future. Fred and George eventually communicate, and the families become friends. Fred is amazed by George's futuristic gadgets and decides to use them to help Mr. Slate in a competition at the upcoming company picnic. Fred introduces George to Slate, claiming that George is a distant cousin. Slate is reluctant at first to trust George, but since rival businessman, Turk Tarpit's cheating has set him back, Slate accepts their help in exchange for getting their jobs back. George and Fred use future technology to help Slate win several games, but in the last event, Astro's and Dino's actions cause Tarpit to become the winner. In the end, Slate once again fires Fred and Barney.

While Mr. Spacely continues to vent over his failing business, Henry Orbit and Rosie the Robot Maid assemble a "time machine retriever" to bring the Jetsons back. But when they turn it on, the time machine returns with the Flintstones instead. Upon seeing they really are cavemen, Spacely introduces them to the press.

Stuck in the past, George asks Mr. Slate for a job. Slate initially rejects, but when Tarpit offers George work, Slate immediately makes George his partner, and George soon becomes famous. Using their newfound fame and riches, the Jetsons buy multiple local businesses and are soon overwhelmed. Meanwhile, Mr. Spacely makes Fred the spokesman for his company, but R.U.D.I. leaks this information to S.A.R.A. When Spacely is introducing Fred to some important investors, Cogswell introduces Barney instead, leading to a rift in Fred's and Barney's friendship. Meanwhile, Rosie requests R.U.D.I. to help Henry and her try to fix the time machine to find the Jetsons. S.A.R.A. appears and demands that R.U.D.I. get rid of Rosie before she departs, but R.U.D.I. agrees to do whatever he can to get the Jetsons back and leaves S.A.R.A. for good. They fix the time machine, and Rosie is transported to the Stone Age where she finds her family.

Now able to return home, the Jetsons leave, taking Fred's car with them, after Judy says goodbye to a teen idol, Iggy. Mr. Spacely concocts a plan to use Fred's car as a model for futuristic replicas. Cogswell sends his robotic dog, Sentro, to steal this information since S.A.R.A. is no longer useful when she tells him that R.U.D.I. broke up with her and told her off. The two families manage to stop Sentro, destroying the evidence he had collected. Spacely's business of selling Stone Age style cars becomes successful, and he even agrees to sell one to Cogswell. However, Spacely warns Cogswell that if he copies any part of it, Spacely will sue him and take over his business. Fred and Barney repair their friendship, Spacely lets George keep his job, and George offers his partnership with Mr. Slate to Fred and Barney to give them their jobs back. Just as they are about to leave for home, Elroy tells them the time machine is broken and cannot be repaired. Fortunately, they are able to return to the Stone Age because Fred's car absorbed the time machine's "quadrapotents." The Flintstones and the Rubbles then bid a fond farewell to the Jetsons and are sent back to the Stone Age.

Voice cast
 Henry Corden as Fred Flintstone
 George O'Hanlon as George Jetson
 Mel Blanc as Barney Rubble, Dino the Dinosaur, and Mr. Spacely
 Jean Vander Pyl as Wilma Flintstone and Rosie the Robot Maid
 Penny Singleton as Jane Jetson
 Julie Dees as Betty Rubble, Jet Rivers, Investor, Panelist, and Harem Girl
 Janet Waldo as Judy Jetson and S.A.R.A.
 Daws Butler as Elroy Jetson, Cogswell, and Henry Orbit
 John Stephenson as Mr. Slate
 Hamilton Camp as Turk Tarpit
 Don Messick as Astro the Space Mutt, R.U.D.I. and M.A.C.C.
 Jon Bauman as Iggy
 Brenda Vaccaro as DiDi
 Frank Welker as Dan Rathmoon, Johnny, and Mr. Goldbrick
 Patric Zimmerman as additional voices
 Catherine Thompson as additional voices
 Howard Morris as additional voices

Home media
The movie has been released on VHS four times, first by Worldvision Home Video, then by Kid Klassics (using the same cassette as the previous release) in 1987, its parent company, GoodTimes Home Video, in 1989, and by Warner Home Video on July 3, 2001. On June 14, 2011, Warner Archive released The Jetsons Meet the Flintstones on DVD in NTSC picture format with all-region encoding, for the very first time as part of their Hanna-Barbera Classics Collection. This is a Manufacture-on-Demand (MOD) release available exclusively through Warner's online store and Amazon.com.

On August 24, 2017, Boomerang's streaming service added the film to its Video On Demand.

On August 4, 2020, Warner Bros. Home Entertainment gave it its first wide release as part of the DVD collection The Flintstones: 2 Movies & 5 Specials.

On October 13, 2020, it was included as a bonus feature on the DVD set The Jetsons: The Complete Series.

Video game
A 1994 Philips CD-i game with a similar premise called Flintstones/Jetsons Time Warp was released in Europe. "A time machine warps Fred Flintstone into the future and George Jetson into the past!"

Follow-up film
 Rockin' with Judy Jetson was released in 1988.
 The Flintstone Kids' "Just Say No" Special was released in 1988.

References

External links

 
 

1987 television films
1987 animated films
1987 films
1980s American animated films
1987 fantasy films
1980s musical comedy films
1980s science fiction comedy films
American children's animated comic science fiction films
American children's animated science fantasy films
American children's animated musical films
American musical comedy films
American television films
Animated films based on animated series
Animated crossover films
Hanna-Barbera animated films
Hanna–Barbera Superstars 10
Animated films about time travel
The Jetsons films
The Flintstones films
Films directed by Ray Patterson (animator)
1987 comedy films
1980s children's animated films